Greatest Hits: 1985–1995, released in Europe as simply Greatest Hits, is a compilation album by the American rock band Heart. This compilation is a companion to the 1998 Epic Records release Greatest Hits (1976–1983) and collects the band's studio hits from the Capitol Records years on a single disc, including the semi-rarities of the Ann Wilson and Cheap Trick singer Robin Zander duet "Surrender to Me" and the previously unreleased studio cover version of John Farnham's "You're the Voice".

Track listing

Personnel 

 Evren Göknar - Mastering Engineer

Certifications

References

2000 greatest hits albums
Albums produced by Keith Olsen
Albums produced by Ron Nevison
Heart (band) compilation albums
Capitol Records compilation albums